Saint-Alban-les-Eaux is a commune in the Loire department in central France.

Death place of Gabriel Bibron (1845).

Population

See also
Communes of the Loire department

References

Communes of Loire (department)